Fitarikandro is a Malagasy football club based in Madagascar.

In 1968 the club won the THB Champions League.

Achievements
THB Champions League: 1
 1968

Performance in CAF competitions
 African Cup of Champions Clubs: 1 appearance
1969

References

External links
Scoreshelf
Wikipedia.fr

Football clubs in Madagascar